Jeff Freeman (born 10 May 1950) is a New Zealand cricketer. He played in one List A and five first-class matches for Northern Districts from 1972 to 1976.

See also
 List of Northern Districts representative cricketers

References

External links
 

1950 births
Living people
New Zealand cricketers
Northern Districts cricketers
Cricketers from Wellington City